Edwin John Victor Pasmore, CH, CBE (3 December 190823 January 1998) was a British artist. He pioneered the development of abstract art in Britain in the 1940s and 1950s.

Early life
Pasmore was born in Chelsham, Surrey, on 3 December 1908. He studied at Summer Fields School in Oxford and Harrow in west London, but with the death of his father in 1927 he was forced to take an administrative job at the London County Council. He studied painting part-time at the Central School of Art and was associated with the formation of the Euston Road School. After experimenting with abstraction, Pasmore worked for a time in a lyrical figurative style, painting views of the River Thames from Hammersmith much in the style of Turner and Whistler.

In the Second World War, Pasmore was a conscientious objector. Having been refused recognition by his Local Tribunal, he was called up for military service in 1942.  He refused orders and was court martialled and sentenced to 123 days imprisonment. The sentence qualified him to go to the Appellate Tribunal in Edinburgh, which allowed him unconditional exemption from military service.

Artistic career

The figurative years: 1927–1947 
One of the first exhibitions in which his works feature was held at the Zwemmer gallery, London 1934. His works were influenced by Monet and Cézanne.

The break into abstraction (1948–1954) 
His break into abstract art was inspired by the artists Piet Mondrian and Paul Klee. Their writings feature nature and the creation of a dynamic harmony in art which stood for the future harmony of society.

Beginning in 1947, he developed a purely abstract style under the influence of Ben Nicholson and other artists associated with Circle, becoming a pioneering figure of the revival of interest in Constructivism in Britain following the War. Pasmore's abstract work, often in collage and construction of reliefs, pioneered the use of new materials and was sometimes on a large architectural scale. Herbert Read described Pasmore's new style as "The most revolutionary event in post-war British art".

In 1950, he was commissioned to design an abstract mural for a bus depot in Kingston upon Thames and the following year Pasmore contributed a mural to the Festival of Britain that promoted a number of the British Constructivists.

Pasmore was a supporter of fellow artist Richard Hamilton, giving him a teaching job in Newcastle and contributing a constructivist structure to the exhibition "This Is Tomorrow" in collaboration with Ernő Goldfinger and Helen Phillips. Pasmore was commissioned to make a mural for the new Newcastle Civic Centre. His interest in the synthesis of art and architecture was given free hand when he was appointed Consulting Director of Architectural Design for Peterlee development corporation in 1955. Pasmore's choices in this area proved controversial; the centerpiece of the town design became an abstract public art structure of his design, the Apollo Pavilion. The structure became the focus for local criticism over the failures of the Development Corporation but Pasmore remained a defender of his work, returning to the town to face critics of the Pavilion at a public meeting in 1982. After many years of neglect the work was restored in 2009 with a grant from the Heritage Lottery Fund.

Pasmore represented Britain at the 1961 Venice Biennale, was participating artist at the Documenta II 1959 in Kassel and was a trustee of the Tate Gallery, donating a number of works to the collection.  He gave a lecture on J.M.W. Turner as 'first of the moderns' to the Turner Society, of which he was elected a vice president in 1975.

Teaching: 1937–1961 
Pasmore was a leading figure in the promotion of abstract art and reform of the fine art education system. From 1943–1949, he taught at Camberwell School of Art where one of his students was Terry Frost whom he advised not to bother with the School's formal teaching and to instead study the works in the National Gallery.

Between 1950 and 1954 Pasmore taught at the Central School of Art.

From 1954 to 1961 he was Master of Painting in the Fine Art Department Durham University, Kings College Newcastle upon Tyne, (now Newcastle University). There he developed a radical art and design course inspired by the 'basic course' of the Bauhaus that became the model for higher arts education across the UK. He was succeeded by Richard Hamilton.

Personal life
In 1940, he married the artist Wendy Blood. They had two children, a son and a daughter. He died in Gudja, Malta, on 23 January 1998, aged 89.

Legacy 
On 3 November 2014, the Central Bank of Malta, in collaboration with the Victor Pasmore Foundation, inaugurated the Victor Pasmore Gallery in the Central Bank's premises at the Polverista Gallery. This gallery houses a permanent exhibition of works discovered in Pasmore's home in Gudja, Malta and also in his residence in Blackheath, London. The exhibition consists primarily of paintings and constructions created while the artist lived in Malta.

See also 

 Abstract painting - 1998 painting by Pasmore

References

Sources
The Times, 1 September 1942.

Further reading
 Grieve, Alastair, Constructed Abstract Art in England: A Neglected Avant-Garde, Yale University Press, 2005. 
 Grieve, Alastair (editor), Victor Pasmore: Towards a New Reality, Tate Publishing, 2010. 
 Bowness, Alan and Lambertini, Luigi, Victor Pasmore: With a Catalogue Raisonne of Paintings, Constructions and Graphics, 1926-79, Thames & Hudson, 1980.

External links 
 
 Central Bank of Malta
 Fondazzjoni Patrimonju Malti

1908 births
1998 deaths
Abstract painters
People from Tandridge (district)
People educated at Harrow School
People educated at Summer Fields School
20th-century English painters
English male painters
Architects from Surrey
British conscientious objectors
Academics of Durham University
Alumni of the Central School of Art and Design
Academics of Camberwell College of Arts
20th-century English architects
Members of the Order of the Companions of Honour
Commanders of the Order of the British Empire
Royal Academicians
20th-century English male artists